Yaniv Rokah is an Israeli-American actor-director.

Early life 
Yaniv Rokah grew up on the Mediterranean in Netanya, Israel. As a young adult, he moved to New York to become an actor.

Career 

Rokah moved to New York in 1999, and to Los Angeles in 2006.  He attended New York's Lee Strasberg Theatre Institute.

Although Rokah landed some small acting roles, he first came to wider attention for his 2015 documentary film, Queen Mimi. The project was funded on Kickstarter.

The subject of the documentary, Marie 'Mimi' Haist, was a homeless woman living in a laundromat frequented by young, unknown actors and helping them do their laundry. Rokah decided to make a film about her.  The film garnered substantial publicity while still in production when actor Zach Galifianakis, who had since become successful with The Hangover series, arranged to give her an apartment, which Renée Zellweger furnished.

Filmography

 Queen Mimi (documentary): "Forced onto the streets in her 50s, Marie “Mimi” Haist found “home” between two rows of washers at a Santa Monica laundromat. After taking shelter there for more than 20 years, 88-year-old Mimi gets her own apartment." Zach Galifianakis plays himself in the film.

 NCIS: Los Angeles  as a supporting actor.
 The Beast as a supporting actor.
 Kendra (YouTube series).
 Dig (TV series) 
 World War Z as a supporting actor.

References

External links 
 Website

Living people
Year of birth missing (living people)